Jim Berryman (born February 17, 1947) is a politician from the U.S. state of Michigan. He is the former mayor of Adrian, Michigan. He previously served as a member of the Michigan Senate, where he represented the 11th district from 1991 to 1994, and the 17th district from 1995 to 1998. He served as mayor of Adrian, Michigan from 1985 to 1990. He is a Democrat and was the first one ever to be elected to the Michigan Senate from Lenawee County. Again, in 2013 Berryman was elected mayor of Adrian (2013-2017).

Early life
Berryman was born on February 17, 1947 and attended Adrian College from 1965 to 1969.

2012 Michigan House of Representatives campaign

On January 6, 2012, Berryman announced his candidacy for the 57th district seat in the Michigan House of Representatives. He ran against the incumbent, Republican Nancy Jenkins. On August 7, 2012, Berryman defeated Harvey Schmidt in the Democratic Party 57th district primary.
 
In the election on November 6, 2012, Berryman was defeated by Nancy Jenkins.

Personal
Berryman lives in Adrian with his wife Susan. They have three children. He is also a member and former president of the Adrian Rotary Club.

References 

1947 births
Living people
Adrian College alumni
Mayors of Adrian, Michigan
Democratic Party Michigan state senators
20th-century American politicians
21st-century American politicians